The Show, the After-Party, the Hotel is the third studio album from American R&B group Jodeci, released July 18, 1995, on Uptown Records and distributed through MCA Records. The album was recorded at Dajhelon Studios in Rochester, New York.

The album peaked at number two on the Billboard 200 chart and was the third album from the group to reach number one on the Top R&B/Hip-Hop Albums chart. By September 1995, it was certified Platinum by the RIAA,  The album has sold 3,350,000 copies in the US  and over 5 million copies worldwide as of March 2015.

Release and reception

The album was certified Platinum by September 1995.

Ron Wynn of Allmusic felt the album itself was poorly edited and sequenced, and though he was critical of the group's overindulgent tendencies and refusal to emphasize radio hits, still stated the album had enough good moments "to make it worthwhile for most urban contemporary listeners." Dimitri Ehrlich of Entertainment Weekly gave note to the group's vocal harmonies and the album's production but felt the work lacked mature lyrics, taking away from Jodeci's authenticity.

Track listing
Unless otherwise noted, Information is based on the album's Liner Notes

Sample Credits
"Bring on Da' Funk"
"Funkin' for Jamaica (N.Y.)" performed by Tom Browne.
"S-More"
"I’m Glad You’re Mine" performed by Al Green. Courtesy of Hi Records. 
"Get On Up
"Velas" performed by Quincy Jones & Toots Thielemans.  Courtesy of A&M Records.

Charts

Weekly charts

Year-end charts

Certifications

Personnel
Information taken from the album's Liner Notes and Allmusic.
All Vocal Arrangements: DeVante Swing (2, 10, 12–14, 16, 18–22)
Lead Vocals: Mr. Dalvin (4, 10, 16), K-Ci (4, 6, 8, 10, 12, 16, 18–20, 22), JoJo (4, 8, 10, 12, 16, 18–20, 22), DeVante Swing (10, 12, 16, 18–19, 21)
Background Vocals: Jodeci (2, 4, 6, 8, 10, 12, 14, 16, 18–22), DeVante Swing (1, 3, 5, 7, 9, 11, 13, 15, 17), Missy Elliott (additional on 2), Timbaland (additional on 2), Playa (additional on 10), Rolita ("Vocal Oohs" on 14)
Musical Arrangements: Mr. Dalvin (4, 6, 8), Missy Elliott (additional on 6)
All Instruments: Devante Swing (1, 3, 5, 7, 9-13, 15, 17, 19, 21–22)
Additional Instruments: Devante Swing (2, 14, 16, 18, 20), Mr. Dalvin (4), Steven "Stevie J" Jordan (4, 6), Darryl Pearson (8)
Guitar: Devante Swing (16, 20), Darryl Pearson (additional on 16, 20)
Acoustic Guitar: Devante Swing (22)
Bass: Mr. Dalvin (4), Devante Swing (18), Cliff Coleson (14), Derek "Duff" DeGrate (additional on 4), Darryl Pearson (additional on 18)
Additional Voices: Tim Leverett (1-News Reporter)
Art Direction: Robert Reives
Artwork & Design: Tim Leverett
Executive Producer: Andre Harrell, Suge Knight
Production Coordinator: Debra Young
Recording Engineer: Jimmy Douglass (4, 6, 8), Gerhard P. Joost II (1-3, 5–7, 9-22), DeVante Swing (1, 3, 5–7, 9, 11, 13, 15, 17, 19, 21), Steve Young (additional on 2), Mikael Ifversen (additional album sequencing), Steve Sola (additional album sequencing)
Audio Mixing: Jimmy Douglass (4, 6, 8), Gerhard P. Joost II (1-3, 5–7, 9-22), DeVante Swing (1-3, 5–7, 9-22)
Mastering: Roger Talkov

Notes

External links
 
 The Show, the After Party, the Hotel at Discogs

See also
List of number-one R&B albums of 1995 (U.S.)

1995 albums
Jodeci albums
Albums produced by Missy Elliott
Albums produced by Stevie J
Albums produced by Timbaland
MCA Records albums
Uptown Records albums